Akbar Shahzaman Ansari (born 3 July 1988) is a Pakistani-British First-class and List A cricketer who played for Cambridge University Cricket Club and Cambridge University Centre of Cricketing Excellence, and List A cricket for Marylebone Cricket Club.  He captained Cambridge UCCE in 2009, and Cambridge University in 2009 and 2010.  His highest score of 193 came when playing for Cambridge University in the match against Oxford University Cricket Club.    His best bowling of 4/50 came in the same match.

His only List A appearance against Bangladesh A he scored 0 and did not take a wicket. He has a younger brother, Zafar Ansari.

He also played 3 Second Eleven Championship games for Surrey's Second XI. and 2 games for them in the Second Eleven Trophy.

He was educated at Hampton School and Trinity Hall, Cambridge.

References

External links
 

English cricketers
Cambridge University cricketers
Living people
Marylebone Cricket Club cricketers
1988 births
People from Ascot, Berkshire
British Asian cricketers
English people of Pakistani descent
British sportspeople of Pakistani descent
Akbar
British people of Sindhi descent
Cambridge MCCU cricketers